Guangdong Zhongyuan High School, commonly abbreviated as Zhongyuan (Chinese: 仲元), located in Shiqiao, Panyu, Guangzhou, is a public school established in 1934, in memorial of Deng Zhongyuan, an important assistant of Dr. Sun Yat-sen. The school has been regarded as one of the prestigious high schools in Guangdong Province and the country.

Educational institutions established in 1934
1934 establishments in China
High schools in Guangdong